José Carlos "Pepe" Soriano (born September 25, 1929) is a prominent Argentine actor, director, and playwright.

Early life
Soriano was born and raised in Buenos Aires, Argentina. Enrolling at the prestigious University of Buenos Aires Law School, he entered one of the university's numerous theatre groups and, leaving law school to devote himself to the theatre, he produced his first work, El chaleco encantado ("The Enchanted Sweater") in 1950, among four other works he completed and staged while in school. Soriano debuted professionally in a production of A Midsummernight's Dream at the renowned Colón Theatre, in 1953.

Debuting in television in 1954, Soriano soon starred in leading roles in Argentine premieres of Paddy Chayefsky's The Tenth Man Marcel Achard's Voulez-vous jouer avec moi? ("Would You Like to Play with Me?"), Eugene O'Neill's Ah, Wilderness! and Carlos Gorostiza's adaptation of Ryūnosuke Akutagawa's Rashomon. These performances earned Soriano the "Martin Fierro" and "Cóndor del Plata" Prizes in 1964, two of the most coveted in Argentine entertainment. Having accepted occasional supporting roles in Argentine cinema, he was cast as the lead in Juan José Jusid's production of Roberto Cossa's tragedy, Tute Cabrero (1968) and in Raúl de la Torre's character study, Juan Lamaglia y Sra. ("Mr. and Mrs. Juan Lamaglia", 1970).

Career

Soriano appeared in a number historical dramas during the turbulent 1970s. Given the title role in David Viñas' play, Lisandro (1971), he received plaudits for his portrayal of Senator Lisandro de la Torre, a fiery muck-raker remembered for his opposition to the excessive influence landowners exercised over government in the 1930s. Following a return to democracy in 1973, Soriano was cast as Schultz, the German,  in Osvaldo Bayer's La Patagonia rebelde ("Rebellion in Patagonia", 1974). The portrayal of the brutal repression of a 1922 sheep ranch workers' strike was made with the assistance of the progressive new Governor of Santa Cruz Province, Jorge Cepernic, and resulted in serious problems for both Cepernic and many of those involved in the film - including Soriano, who left for Spain in 1977.

Anxious to improve their tarnished international image, the new military regime enlisted the relatively moderate General Roberto Viola to persuade exiled artists to return, which some, including Soriano, did. He was cast in the title role by Director Héctor Olivera's film version of Roberto Cossa's grotesque play, La nona ("Granma", 1979). The slow pace of liberalization in the dictatorship's policy towards the arts pushed artists led by playwrights Osvaldo Dragún and Carlos Gorostiza to create an Argentine Open Theatre movement in 1980, to which Soriano was one of the first and best-known adherents. Their July 28, 1981, maiden festival was a success marred by the fire bombing of their Picadero Theatre a week later (an unsolved mystery to this day).

A return to democracy in 1983 allowed Argentine artists to create works critical of the climate of abuses prevalent during the preceding dictatorship and Soriano was cast as the lead in Mercedes Frutos' 1984 film version of Adolfo Bioy Casares' Otra esperanza ("Another Hope"), a horror narrative set in a factory with secrets - a timely metaphor for much of the repression that had targeted industrial workers. Soriano reprised his role of Senator Lisandro de la Torre in Juan José Jusid's Asesinato en el senado de la nación ("An Assassination in the Senate", 1984), a historical drama on the 1935 attempted murder of the reformist senator.

Soriano worked in the theatre less in subsequent years, continuing to accept leading roles in film and on Argentine television. He also starred in Spanish television and was featured for months in Farmacia de guardia ("Night Pharmacy"), among the highest-rated Spanish comedies of the 1990s. His grandfatherly appeal was in demand for Argentine period pieces such as Raúl de la Torre's Funes, un gran amor ("Funes, a Great Love", 1993) and Héctor Olivera's Una sombra ya pronto serás ("A Shadow, You Shall Soon Be", 1994). A similarly bucolic backdrop set the stage for his role as a dying idealist in Diego Arsuaga's El último tren ("The Last Train", 2002), an Uruguayan film indicting unpatriotic business deals.  Soraino has also recently turned to his Jewish roots in theatre works such as Jeff Baron's Visiting Mr. Green, where he teaches an unsympathetic parole officer a lesson in kinship and in cinema such as in the Chilean film, El brindis ("The Toast", 2007), where a Jewish-Chilean patriarch struggles to bring his disparate family closer.

References

External links
Pepe Soriano 
http://www.recursosculturales.com.ar/blog/?p=391 
Cine Nacional 

Jewish Argentine male actors
Jewish Argentine writers
Argentine screenwriters
Male screenwriters
Argentine male writers
Illustrious Citizens of Buenos Aires
1929 births
Living people